The General Dynamics F-111 Aardvark is a U.S. jet fighter-bomber aircraft.

F111 or variation, may also refer to:

Military

Combat aircraft
 General Dynamics–Grumman F-111B, the navy carrier variant
 General Dynamics–Grumman EF-111A Raven, the electronic warfare variant
 General Dynamics–Boeing AFTI/F-111A Aardvark, a research variant
 General Dynamics F-111C, the Australian variant
 General Dynamics F-111K, the British variant
 Canadair CF-111 Starfighter (F-111, CF-104), the Canadian variant of the F-104

Warships
 , an ANZAC-class frigate of New Zealand
 , a Rothesay-class frigate of New Zealand
 , a Type-056 corvette of Bangladesh
  (F-111), a frigate of Romania, former flagship of the fleet
 , a F110-class frigate of Spain

Other uses
 Hispania F111, a 2011 HRT Formula 1 racecar
 Agile Warrior F-111X, a 1995 videogame based on the fighter-bomber
 "F-111" (song), a 2003 song by 'Cold Chisel' off the album Ringside (Cold Chisel album)

See also

 VFC-111, U.S. Navy fighter squadron
 VF-111, U.S. Navy fighter squadron
 VMF-111, U.S. Marines fighter squadron

 F3 (disambiguation)
 F11 (disambiguation)
 F1 (disambiguation)